Donald Penny Schneider (born 1933) is an American television actor and comedian. Born in Brooklyn, New York. He is known for playing the role of Lieutenant Stanley Harris in the American television series The Lieutenant, and Pharmacist Mate Charles Tyler in The Wackiest Ship in the Army.

Penny worked for 38th president of the United States Gerald Ford as a speech writer

Filmography

Film

Television

References

External links 

Rotten Tomatoes profile

Living people
1930s births
People from Brooklyn
Male actors from New York (state)
Comedians from New York (state)
American male television actors
American male soap opera actors
20th-century American male actors
American male comedians
20th-century American comedians